This is a list of the instant cameras sold by the Polaroid Corporation as well as new models sold by Polaroid B.V. Cameras are ordered by type.

Roll film

These cameras took Polaroid Picture Roll Land film, which was discontinued in 1992. Some of these cameras can be converted to take pack film, but others cannot.

40 Series (3.25 x 4.25-inch, 83 x 108 mm)
Model 95 (1948–1953)
Model 95A "Speedliner" (1954–1957)
Model 95B "Speedliner" (1957–1961)
Model 100 "One Hundred" (1954–1957)
Model 110 "Pathfinder" (1952–1957)
Model 110A "Pathfinder" (1957–1960)
Model 110B "Pathfinder" (1960–1964)
Model 120 (1961–1965)
Model 150 (1957–1960)
Model 160 (1962–1965)
Model 700 (1955–1957)
Model 800 "The 800" (1957–1962)
Model 850 (1961–1963)
Model 900 (1960–1963)
Model J66 (1961–1963)
 30 Series (2.5 x 3.25-inch, 64 x 83 mm)
Model 80 "Highlander" (1954–1957)
Model 80A "Highlander" (1957–1959)
Model 80B "Highlander" (1959–1961)
Model J33 (1961–1963)
 20 Series (2.5 x 3.25-inch, 64 x 83 mm)
Model 20 "Swinger" (1965–1970)
Model M15 "Swinger Sentinel"
Swinger II

Pack film (colorpack)
100 Series (2.875 x 3.75-inch, 72 x 95 mm)
100 Series folding cameras
Model 100 (1963–1966)
Model 101 (1964–1967)
Model 102 (1964–1967) [1]
Model 103 (1965–1967)
Model 104 (1965–1967)
Model 125 (1965–1967) [1]
Model 135 (1965–1967) [1]
200 Series folding cameras
Model 210 (1967–1969)
Model 215 (1968–1970) [1]
Model 220 (1967–1969)
Model 225 (1968–1970) [1]
Model 230 (1967–1969)
Model 240 (1967–1969)
Model 250 (1967–1969)
300 Series folding cameras
Model 315 (1969–1971) [1]
Model 320 (1969–1971)
Model 325 (1969–1971) [1]
Model 330 (1969–1971)
Model 335 (1969–1971) [1]
Model 340 (1969–1971)
Model 350 (1969–1971)
Model 355 (1975) [2]
Model 360 (1969–1971)
Countdown M60 (1970) [1]
Countdown M80 (1970) [1]
400 Series folding cameras
Model 420 (1971–1977)
Model 430 (1971–1977)
Model 440 (1971–1976)
Model 450 (1971–1974)
Model 455 (1975–1976) [2]
Countdown 70 (1971–1973) [1]
Countdown 90 (1971–1973) [1]
Other folding cameras
Model 180 (1965–1969)
Model 185
Model 185 Millennium (2000-) [2]
Model 190 (1974–1977) [2]
Model 195 (1974–1976) [6]
The Reporter (1977) [3][6]
EE100 (1977) [3]
EE100 Special [3]
ProPack [3]
Non-folding cameras
600 (1978) [2]
600SE (1978)
Model 3000 "Big Swinger" (1968–1970)
Big Shot (1971–1973)
Clincher (1975) [1][3]
Clincher 2 [1][3]
The Colorpack (1973–1975)
Colorpack II (1969–1972)
Colorpack III (1970–1971)
Colorpack IV (1969–1971) [1]
Colorpack V "CP5" (1973–1975) [1]
Colorpack 100 (1975–1976) [2]
Colorpack 200 (1977–1978) [2][3]
Colorpack M6 (1970–1971)
EE55 (1976–1977) [2][3]
EE58 (1977–1978) [2][3]
EE60 (1976–1977) [2][3]
EE66 (1976–1977) [2][3]
Instant 30 (1978) [2][3]
Memory Maker [1]
Minute Maker (1977) [3][4]
Minute Maker Plus (1977–1978) [3][6]
Super Colorpack (1971–1972)
Super Colorpack IV (1971–1972) [1]
Super Colour Swinger III (1976–1978) [2][3]
Super Shooter (1975–1977) [3][6]
Super Shooter Plus (1975–1977) [3]
80 Series (2.75 x 2.875-inch, 69 x 72 mm)
Colorpack 80 (1971–1976) [2]
Colorpack 82 (1971–1975) [2]
Colorpack 85 (1971–1975) [2]
Colorpack 88 (1971–1975) [2]
Colour Swinger (1975–1978) [2]
Colour Swinger II (1975) [2]
EE22 (1976–1977) [2]
EE33 (1976–1977) [2]
EE38 (1977–1978) [2]
EE44 (1976–1977) [2]
EE88 (1976) [2]
Electric Zip (1975–1978)
Instant 10 (1978) [2]
Instant 20 (1978) [2]
Square Shooter (1971–1972)
Square Shooter 2 (1972–1975)
Square Shooter 4 (1972–1975) [1]
Super Colour Swinger (1975–1977) [2]
Super Colour Swinger II (1975–1978) [2]
Super Swinger [2]
Swinger EE (1976–1978) [2]
Zip (1974–1977)
Viva with electronic flash No.M1183 (1984) for Caribbean market

Integral SX-70 Film
These cameras included both folding SLRs and less expensive nonfolding models. They take the SX-70 film, a format with a ~3.1 x 3.1 in² (77 x 77 mm) square image area and a ~4.2 x 3.5 in² (108 x 88 mm²) total area, and a sensitivity around ISO 160. They come with a built-in 6-volt zinc chloride "PolaPulse" battery pack, replaced with a lithium-ion pack in Polaroid B.V. remakes.

Folding cameras
SX-70 (1972–1977)
SX-70 Alpha 1 (1977)
SX-70 Alpha 1 Executive (1977) [1]
SX-70 Alpha 1 24 Kt Gold Mildred Scheel
SX-70 Alpha 1 Model 2 (1977)
SX-70 Executive (1975–1977) [1]
SX-70 Model 2 (1974–1977)
SX-70 Model 3 (1975–1978)
SX-70 Sonar OneStep (1978)
SX-70 Sonar OneStep Gold
TimeZero SX-70 AutoFocus (1981)
TimeZero SX-70 AutoFocus Model 2 (1981)
Non-folding cameras
Model 500 [2]
Model 1000 (1977) [2]
Model 1000 S [2]
Model 1000 SE
Model 1500 (1977) [2]
Model 2000 (1976) [2]
Model 3000 (1977) [2]
Encore (1977) [1]
Instant 1000 [2]
Instant 1000 DeLuxe [2]
OneStep (1977) [4][5][6]
OneStep Plus [1]
Presto! (1978) [1]
Pronto! (1976–1977) [4][5][6]
Pronto! B (1977)
Pronto! Extra (1977–1978)
Pronto! Plus (1976–1977)
Pronto! RF (1977) [4][5][6]
Pronto! S (1976–1977) [1]
Pronto! SM (1976–1977) [1]
Pronto! Sonar OneStep (1978) [5]
Sonar AutoFocus 5000 [2]
Super Clincher [1]
Supercolor 1000 [2]
Supercolor 1000 DeLuxe [2]
Supercolor AutoFocus [2]
Supercolor AutoFocus 3500 [2]
The Button (1981)
TimeZero OneStep (1981)
TimeZero Pronto AF (1981)

600

The 600 film have the same dimensions as that of the SX-70. The sensitivity is higher at around ISO 640. It also has a battery pack, for which Polaroid has released a small radio.
600 (2000s)
600 Business Edition
600 Business Edition 2 (2000-)
636 Double Exposure
636 CloseUp (1996)
Amigo 610
Amigo 620 (1982)
Barbie Instant Camera (1999–2001)
Bicentennial "We The People" (1987)
Cool Cam (1988)
Construction Camera
Impulse (1988)
Impulse AF (1988)
Impulse QPS
JobPro (1992)
JobPro 2 (2000-)
NightCam
One (2003)
One600 Classic (2004)
One600 Pro (2004)
One600 JobPro (2004)
One600 Ultra (2004)
One600 Nero (2004) [1]
One600 Panna (2005) [1]
One600 Rossa (2004) [1]
OneStep 600 (1983)
OneStep 600 Express (1997–2002)
OneStep 600 Flash
OneStep 600 Flash Close-Up (just OneStep after 1998)
OneStep AF (1997-)
OneStep Silver Express
OneStep Talking Camera (1997–1998)
P-Cam
Pronto 600 [2]
Quick 610
Revue 600
SLR 680 (1982–1987) [6]
SLR 690 (1998)
Spice Cam (1997)
Spirit [1]
Spirit 600 [1]
Spirit 600 CL [1]
Sun 600 LMS (1983)
Lightmixer 630
Sun 635 SE
Sun 640 (1981)
Sun 650 (1982)
Sun 660 (1981)
Revue Autofocus 660
Supercolor 600
Supercolor 635 [2]
Supercolor 635 CL [2]
Supercolor 645 CL [2]
Supercolor 670 AF [2]
Supercolor Elite [1]
Taz Instant Camera (1999–2001)
Hello Kitty Instant Camera

Spectra
The Spectra has an image area of 2.9 x 3.6 in² (73 x 91 mm²) and a total area of 4.05 x 4.0 in² (103 x 102 mm²).
Image [2]
Image 2 [2]
Image1200 (2004)
Image Elite Pro [2]
Macro 5 SLR
Image Pro (1995)
Minolta Instant Pro (1996) Same as Image Pro, Build by Polaroid for Minolta
Pro Cam (1996–2000)
Spectra (1986) [6]
Spectra 2
Spectra 1200i (2000-)
Spectra 1200si (2000-)
Spectra 1200FF (2001)
Spectra Onyx (1987)
Spectra Pro (1990–1998)

Captiva
Captiva (1993–1997)
JoyCam (1999)
PopShots (1999–2001)
Vision (1993)
Vision date:+ (1993–1997)
P-500 Digital Photo Printer

Pocket cameras
i-Zone (1999)*izone200 (2004)
I-Zone 200 (2005)
i-Zone Convertible (2001–2002)
i-Zone Digital Combo (2000–2001)
i-Zone with Radio (2001–2002)
Mio (2001)
Xiao (1997) [2]
Polaroid Go (2021)

Large-format cameras
20 x 24" camera (1976)
40 x 80" camera at Boston's Museum of Fine Arts (1976)

i-Type cameras
The i-Type is a new film format introduced by Polaroid B.V. It is Polaroid 600 film with the battery moved from the film pack and into the camera. All of the following cameras include a flash.
Impossible I-1 (2016) – designed by Teenage Engineering; automatically selects between five fixed-focus lenses: macro, close-up, near, mid and far; ring flash; additional features are available via a smartphone app (remote trigger, self timer, double exposure, noise trigger, light painting, color paint and manual control of aperture, shutter speed, flash strength and focus); tripod socket
Polaroid Originals OneStep 2 (2017) – one fixed-focus standard lens
Polaroid Originals OneStep 2 Viewfinder – one fixed-focus standard lens; upgraded viewfinder
Polaroid Originals OneStep+ (2018) – manually selectable between two fixed-focus lenses: standard and portrait; additional features are available via a smartphone app (e.g. double exposure, light painting, remote trigger)
Polaroid Now (2020) – automatically selects between two fixed-focus lenses: standard and portrait; dedicated double exposure button
Polaroid Now+ (2021) – automatically selects between two fixed-focus lenses: standard and portrait; filters; tripod socket; additional features are available via a smartphone app (e.g. double exposure, light painting, remote trigger, aperture priority/depth of field, tripod mode/long exposure; various manual controls)

Printing units
These are units that expose films using a smartphone display. They are optimized for 600/i-Type film packs, although SX-70 is also supported.

Impossible Instant Lab (2013)
Impossible Instant Lab Universal (2015)
Polaroid Lab (2019)

Notes
Special markets model.
International model, not sold in United States.
These cameras can use both 100 and 80 Series film.
Specially badged "BC" model for Kmart stores also exists.
Specially badged "Sears Special" model for Sears stores also exists.
"SE" model also exists.

References

External links
 The Land List

Technology-related lists

 
Lists of photography topics